Foeni (or Feuenfeld) is a commune in Timiș County, Romania. It is composed of two villages, Cruceni and Foeni (commune seat).

Geography 
Foeni is located in the southwest of Timiș County, on the border with Serbia. It borders Uivar to the north, Ciacova and Giulvăz to the east, Giera to the south and Serbia to the west. The entire territory of the commune is included in the Great Plain of Timiș, which sprawls in the west and southwest of the county, a flat land, with heights not exceeding 80 m. At the southern limit of the commune is the Timiș River (on the east–west direction). On the north–south direction, the commune is crossed by Bega Mică, partially canalized.

The territory of the commune is unitary; the average annual temperature is about 11 °C. The coldest month is January, and the maximum temperatures are recorded in July. The most frequent winds are from the east; the most violent winds blow from the west, northwest, bringing strong storms especially during August and September.

Like the rest of the area, the landscape of Foeni is extremely flat; vegetation is missing, pronounced unevenness is missing. The areas bordering the waters are the only ones where the vegetation and the immediate relief change the local characteristics of the landscape.

History 

Foeni was first mentioned in 1289, under the name Föen, on the occasion of the convocation here of a diet by King Ladislaus III. Attested by the Ravenna Geographer, the Roman castrum of Bacaucis lied on Foeni's present-day hearth, on the road from Tibiscum to Lederata. The first to do systematic research was Augustin Bárány, in 1845, after a large number of objects and bricks with Roman seals were found in the area. In 1890, Francisc Cumont makes a scientific description of the results of Bárány's research and concludes that in the garden of Mocioni Mansion and near it is the foundation of the Roman castrum. At the same time, epigraphic monument, coins, vessels, etc. were discovered. In 934, in Foeni, in the place called Vadum Arenarum, near the Timiș River, a battle between the Hungarian invaders and the reunited troops of the Pechenegs, Romanians and Bulgarians led by Duke Glad took place. The battle ended with Glad's defeat, who then had to prepare a new resistance at Kevea (probably Kovin, Serbia) and then at Orșova. Although he lost the battles, Glad and his successors continued to lead the duchy until 1003–1004 when Glad's dynasty was replaced by Chanadinus.

At the beginning of the 18th century, after the conquest of the area by the Austrians, due to the conflict, only 18 houses remained in Foeni. In the same century, towards the end of it, the Mocioni family appears in the area. They established their residence in Foeni, where in 1750 they built a Neoclassical mansion here.

Cruceni was originally located in the "Place of the Cross", a few kilometers from the current village, towards Timiș River. The present-day Cruceni was created by German colonization in 1722, being designed according to the same Austrian models adapted to Banat, with straight and perpendicular streets. The first church, a Roman Catholic one, was built in 1780. The new church was built in 1914. After the establishment of the Austro-Hungarian dualism in 1868, the first Hungarian families of tobacco growers began to come to Cruceni. 75 families settle here at that time, to whom a plot of land with one juger of built-up land and seven jugers of arable land is distributed. Towards the end of the 19th century, the village became predominantly Hungarian, while Germans moved to other localities.

Foeni and Cruceni were severely affected by the April 2005 floods that saw 90% of homes flooded and 1,100 people displaced.

Demographics 

Foeni had a population of 1,737 inhabitants at the 2011 census, up 1% from the 2002 census. Most inhabitants are Romanians (74.84%), larger minorities being represented by Hungarians (13.87%), Serbs (5.87%) and Roma (1.09%). For 3.8% of the population, ethnicity is unknown. By religion, most inhabitants are Orthodox (73.63%), but there are also minorities of Roman Catholics (14.39%), Serbian Orthodox (5.58%) and Pentecostals (1.9%). For 3.86% of the population, religious affiliation is unknown.

References 

Communes in Timiș County
Localities in Romanian Banat